Merry Mavericks is a 1951 short subject directed by Edward Bernds starring American slapstick comedy team The Three Stooges (Moe Howard, Larry Fine and Shemp Howard). It is the 133rd entry in the series released by Columbia Pictures starring the comedians, who released 190 shorts for the studio between 1934 and 1959.

Plot
Set in the Old West, Peaceful Gulch is not so peaceful as Red Morgan (Don C. Harvey) and his roughnecks have run the sheriff out of town. In attempt to bring normalcy back to their little town, some of the sheriff's posse concoct a scheme to trick Morgan and his hombres into thinking that there are three famous marshalls headed into town to bring back law and order.

The Stooges, mistaken for the three famous marshalls, are asked to stop Morgan and his men from stealing money in an old house haunted by the ghost of a headless Native American chief (John Merton). The trio soon find that the ghost is none other than one of Morgan's men. Shemp knocks out the henchman and dons the costume for himself. He soon runs into Moe and Larry who have been captured by Morgan. Still disguised, Shemp knocks out everyone in the room with his hatchet and the boys are heroes once again.

Production notes
Merry Mavericks was filmed June 13–16, 1950, but not released until September 1951. It is a partial remake of Phony Express, using minimal stock footage from the original.

References

External links 
 
 

1951 films
The Three Stooges films
American black-and-white films
The Three Stooges film remakes
1950s Western (genre) comedy films
Films directed by Edward Bernds
Columbia Pictures short films
1951 comedy films
1950s English-language films
1950s American films